Marisa Rezende (born 8 August 1944) is a Brazilian music educator and composer.

Personal life 
Marisa Rezende was born in Rio de Janeiro, the daughter of a doctor (Nunes de Barcellos) and his wife (Costa Pereira) of Portuguese ancestry. She began playing piano at four without instruction and began lessons at age five. She studied piano at Escola de Musica in Rio, but her studies were interrupted by marriage. The couple moved in 1964 to Boston, Massachusetts, where her husband worked on a master's degree at MIT.

Rezende had two daughters in Boston, and when the family moved back to Rio in 1967, she had a third daughter before resuming her studies in composition. The family moved to Recife, where she worked as a pianist with the orchestra and finished her undergraduate degree. She studied fugue and counterpoint with Morelenbaum and Virginia Fiuza and composition with Padre Jaime Diniz.

Career 
After graduating, she completed a master's degree in piano at the University of California, Santa Barbara, where she studied composition with Peter Fricker and David Gordon. She also completed a doctorate in composition at UCSB, and post-doctoral work at the University of Keele, England. After completing her studies, she took a position at Escola de Musica in Rio teaching composition. In 1989 she helped to found Musica Nova, an organization to premiere new music compositions, working with Rodolfo Caesar and Rodrigo Cicchelli. In 1999 she was awarded the Bolsa Vitae de Artes. She retired from teaching in 2002 but operates the Music and Technology Lab at the Federal University of Rio de Janeiro and continues work as a composer.

Published works 
Rezende has composed for orchestra, chamber ensemble and solo instrument and her compositions been performed internationally. Selected works include:

Volante (1990) for flute, clarinet, cello and piano
Syntagma (1988) for flute, percussion and piano
Variations (1995) for flute
Elos (1995) for harpsichord
Resonances (1983) for piano
Mutations (1991) for piano four hands
Contrasts (2001) for piano
Vortex (1997) for string quartet
Schisms (1997) for violin, viola, cello, bass and piano

Her work has been recorded and issued on CD including:
Marisa Rezende - Música de Câmara (2006)

References

External links 

1944 births
Living people
20th-century classical composers
Brazilian music educators
Women classical composers
Brazilian classical composers
Women music educators
20th-century women composers